May Glacier is a channel glacier about  wide and  long, flowing to the coast of Antarctica between Cape Morse and Cape Carr.

See also
 List of glaciers in the Antarctic
 Glaciology

References

 

Glaciers of Wilkes Land